Vesterbro Torv (Lit. Western-faubourg Square) is a public square located in the Vesterbro neighborhood of Aarhus, Denmark. Vesterbro Torv is the junction where 8 street meet; Vesterbrogade, Hjortensgade, Langelandsgade, Teglværksgade, Nørre Allé, Vesterport, Vester Allé and Janus la Cours Gade. It is one of the most heavily trafficked areas in the city, receiving traffic from Åbyhøj and Brabrand in the west along Silkeborgvej and from Tilst in the north-west along Viborgvej. The square is designed as a central "island" surrounded by streets. The central part is primarily used for parking although there is a few recreational facilities such as public toilets and benches.

History 
Vesterbro Torv was in the early 1800s an unused area south of the road leading to Viborg. During the 1840s the area was gradually used as a market place when the cattle trade was moved from an area by the city gate Frederiksport . The area is mentioned in different sources of the time as Kvægtorvet (Cattle market) and later Grisetorvet (Pig market). In the 1880s permanent stalls for sheep and pigs where installed and the area was paved in cobblestones surrounded by a banister. In 1890 the square was named Vesterbro Torv for the neighborhood Vesterbro that had grown up around it. The cattle trade continued until 1907 when it was moved to Aarhus Offentlige Slagtehus (Aarhus Public Slaughterhouse) which had opened in 1895. In 1913 the local beautification association began work to renovate the square. Funds were collected from the people living in the area which yielded 1000 DKK, the association itself gave 500 DKK and the city council contributed another 500 DKK.

In the 1950s the square was substantially altered when underground parking garages were built and a monumental office building was constructed on the south side of the square. The older buildings around the square was gradually replaced over the following years and in 1976 the last large building was constructed on Vesterbro Torv no. 10. The only original building from the 1800s is a corner building by Vesterport. In 2016 one of the two last low 1- and 2-story buildings were demolished to make way for a 5-story residential building while proposals to redevelop the remaining building was passing review in the city council.

Notes and references

Squares in Aarhus
Aarhus C